Oberlin  may refer to:
 Places in the United States
 Oberlin Township, Decatur County, Kansas
 Oberlin, Kansas, a city in the township
 Oberlin, Louisiana, a town
 Oberlin, Ohio, a city
 Oberlin, Licking County, Ohio, a ghost town
 Oberlin, Pennsylvania, a census-designated place
 Mount Oberlin, Glacier National Park, Montana

 Schools
 Oberlin University, a private university in Machida, Tokyo, Japan
 Oberlin College, a liberal arts college in Oberlin, Ohio
 Oberlin High School (Louisiana), Oberlin, Louisiana, United States
 Oberlin High School (Ohio), Oberlin, Ohio, United States
 Oberlin High School, Jamaica

 People
 Oberlin (surname)
 Oberlin Smith (1840–1926), American engineer